The Utterly Fantastic and Totally Unbelievable Sound of Los Straitjackets is the debut studio album by American instrumental rock band Los Straitjackets, released in March 1995 by Upstart Records. It was recorded in July 1994 at Alex the Great Studio, produced by Ben Vaughn and engineered by Brad Jones.

Track listing

Personnel
Los Straitjackets
Danny Amis – guitar
Eddie Angel – guitar
Scott Esbeck – bass
Jimmy Lester –  drums
Additional personnel
Ben Vaughn – production
Brad Jones – engineering

References

Los Straitjackets albums
1995 debut albums